The School of London was a loose movement of 20th century painters, based principally in London, who were interested in figurative painting, in contrast to the abstraction, minimalism, and conceptualism which were dominant at the time. The London School of painters pursued an art focused on a kind of loose figurative form of post war Realism that reflected of the forms and people and the world around them. The term resonated regardless of the fact that there was no agreement of what this new figurative painting should look like, since the styles of painting of the group so markedly differed. Ranging from the violent brushwork presented by Bacon and Andrews, to the more explicit figuration of the celebrated Lucian Freud, and David Hockney.
The common thread that held the London group together is less any form of explicit expression  rather than their shared appreciation for the tradition and history of Figurative painting in a time dominated by Abstract painting. At the time this new wave of figurative painting was very controversial running against the dominance of abstraction, minimalism, and conceptualism violating the sacred hermetic codes that defined these forms of art.

Painters associated with the School of London included Michael Andrews, Frank Auerbach, Francis Bacon, Lucian Freud, David Hockney, Howard Hodgkin, R.B. Kitaj, Anne Dunn and Leon Kossoff.

The term School of London was first used in the catalog for R.B. Kitaj's 1976 Hayward Gallery exhibition in which Kitaj wrote

There are artistic personalities in this small island more unique and strong and I think more numerous than anywhere in the world outside America's jolting artistic vigor. There are ten or more people in this town, or not far away, of world class, including my friends of abstract persuasion. In fact I think there is a substantial School of London... If some of the strange and fascinating personalities you may encounter here were given a fraction of the internationalist attention and encouragement reserved in this barren time for provincial and orthodox vanguardism, a School of London might be more real than the one I have construed in my head. A School of real London in England, in Europe ... with potent art lessons for foreigners emerging from this odd old, put upon, very singular place.

See also
 Art of the United Kingdom

References

Sources
 
 
 
 
 

British art movements
Figurative art
20th century in art
Arts in London